Physemus is a genus of minute marsh beetles in the family Limnichidae. There are currently six described species.

Species
These six species belong to the genus Physemus:
 Physemus excavatus Wooldridge, 1976 i c g
 Physemus latifrons Wooldridge, 1984 i c g
 Physemus levis Wooldridge, 1984 i c g
 Physemus minutus Leconte, 1854 i c g b
 Physemus mirus Wooldridge, 1984 i c g
 Physemus punctatus Wooldridge, 1976 i c g
Data sources: i = ITIS, c = Catalogue of Life, g = GBIF, b = Bugguide.net

References

Further reading

 

Byrrhoidea
Articles created by Qbugbot